{{Automatic taxobox
| taxon = Lottiidae
| image = Collisella pelta.jpg
| image_caption = A live individual of Lottia pelta
| authority = J. E. Gray, 1840
| synonyms_ref = 
| synonyms = Lottidae [sic] 
| type_genus = 
| subdivision_ranks = Genera
| subdivision = See text
| display_parents = 3
}}

Lottiidae is a family of sea snails, specifically true limpets, marine gastropod mollusks in the superfamily Lottioidea and the clade Patellogastropoda (according to the taxonomy of the Gastropoda by Bouchet & Rocroi, 2005).

 Subfamilies 

 2005 taxonomy 
This family consists of the two following subfamilies (according to the taxonomy of the Gastropoda by Bouchet & Rocroi, 2005):
 Lottiinae Gray, 1840
 tribe Lottiini Gray, 1840 - synonym: Tecturidae Gray, 1847
 tribe Scurriini Lindberg, 1988
 Patelloidinae Chapman & Gabriel, 1923

 2007 taxonomy 
Nakano & Ozawa (2007) made changes in taxonomy of Patellogastropoda based on molecular phylogeny research: Acmaeidae Forbes, 1850 is a synonym of Lottiidae and assigned genera Acmaea and Niveotectura into Lottiidae.

A cladogram showing phylogenic relations of Patellogastropoda:

 Genera 

Genera within the family Lottiidae include:

Subfamily Lottiinae
 tribe Lottiini
 Discurria Lindberg, 1988
 Lottia Gray, 1833 - type species of the family Lottiidae
 Notoacmea Iredale, 1915
 Scurria Gray, 1847

Subfamily Patelloidinae Chapman & Gabriel, 1923
 Patelloida Quoy & Gaimard, 1834

 Collisella Dall, 1871: synonym of Lottia Gray, 1833

Subfamily Tecturinae Gray, 1847
 Tectura Gray, 1847
Subfamily incertae sedis(Genera that were under Acmaeidae by Bouchet & Rocroi (2005) formerly in subfamily Rhodopetalinae):
 Actinoleuca Oliver, 1926
 Asteracmea Oliver, 1926
 Atalacmea Iredale, 1915
 † Boreoblinia O. Yu. Anistratenko, Burger & V. V. Anistratenko, 2010 
 Nipponacmea Sasaki & Okutani, 1993
 Niveotectura Habe, 1944
 Potamacmaea Peile, 1922
 Radiacmea Iredale, 1915
 Testudinalia Moskalev, 1966
 Yayoiacmea'' Sasaki & Okutani, 1993

References 

 
Taxa named by John Edward Gray